The Armchair Detective is a 1952 British mystery film directed by Brendan J. Stafford and starring Ernest Dudley, Hartley Power, and Sally Newton. It was made at Viking Studios.  According to Stephen Chibnall "critics thought it better heard than seen."

Cast
 Ernest Dudley as himself  
 Hartley Power as Nicco  
 Sally Newton as Penny  
 Derek Elphinstone as Inspector Carter  
 Iris Russell as Jane  
 David Oxley as Terry  
 Lionel Grose as Sergeant 
 Anna Korda as Woman

References

External links

1952 films
British mystery films
1950s mystery films
1950s English-language films
Films shot at Kensington Studios
Films set in London
British black-and-white films
1950s British films